Alf Chorley was an English-born rugby league footballer who represented New Zealand.

Playing career
Chorley played for Halifax (Heritage № 8), and Swinton before moving to New Zealand.

Chorley was involved with the early years of rugby league in Auckland, playing for Auckland in 1908 and competing for City in the first match sanctioned by the Auckland Rugby League in 1909.

Chorley played a Test match for New Zealand in 1910 against the touring Great Britain Lions. Aged 36 years and 46 days old at the time, Chorley still holds the record as the oldest Kiwi.

World War I and personal life
Alfred Chorley married Elizabeth Chorley in Wakefield, England, on 16 September 1897. At the time of his enlistment in the army in World War I, they were living at 72 Khyber Pass Road in Auckland. Chorley stated that his occupation was a "motorman" on his enlistment form. Chorley's war service commenced on 27 June 1916 and he was discharged on 21 January 1919, being judged 'over age to serve any longer'. By this point he would have been 44 and a half years old.

References

1874 births
1960 deaths
Auckland rugby league team players
City Rovers players
English emigrants to New Zealand
English rugby league players
Halifax R.L.F.C. players
New Zealand national rugby league team players
Newton Rangers players
Ponsonby Ponies players
Rugby league fullbacks
Rugby league players from Wakefield
Swinton Lions players